Tawambi Jahmon Settles (born January 19, 1976) is a former American football defensive back who played one season with the Jacksonville Jaguars of the National Football League (NFL). He played college football at Duke University and attended The McCallie School in Chattanooga, Tennessee. He was also a member of the Detroit Lions, Green Bay Packers, New York Giants, New York/New Jersey Hitmen, Grand Rapids Rampage, Detroit Fury, Toronto Argonauts, and Hamilton Tiger-Cats.

Early years
In high school, Settles played quarterback and defensive back for the McCallie School Blue Tornado. He was an All-State, three-time All-Region, and three-time All-District selection for the Blue Tornado. He also earned four letters in basketball, three in football, two in track, and one in baseball.

College career
Settles played for the Duke Blue Devils from 1994 to 1997. He recorded totals of 262 tackles, 18 passes broken up, and five interceptions during his college career. He also blocked a total of eight field goals and extra points.

Professional career
Settles signed with the NFL's Detroit Lions after going undrafted in the 1998 NFL Draft. He was released by the Lions during training camp. He was signed to the practice squad of the Green Bay Packers later that season. Settles signed with the Jacksonville Jaguars of the NFL and played in seven games for the team during the 1998 season. He was signed by the NFL's New York Giants in 2000.

He played for the New York/New Jersey Hitmen of the XFL in 2001, recording eleven tackles and one interception.

On June 21, 2002, Settles was signed to the practice squad of the Grand Rapids Rampage of the Arena Football League (AFL). He was promoted to the active roster on June 27. He was released by the Rampage on July 15. Settles signed with the AFL's Detroit Fury on July 17, 2002.

He was signed by the Toronto Argonauts of the Canadian Football League on March 30, 2004. He was traded to the Hamilton Tiger-Cats on June 9 and played in six games for the team during the 2004 season.

References

External links
Just Sports Stats

Living people
1976 births
Players of American football from Tennessee
American football cornerbacks
American football safeties
Canadian football linebackers
African-American players of American football
African-American players of Canadian football
Duke Blue Devils football players
Jacksonville Jaguars players
New York/New Jersey Hitmen players
Grand Rapids Rampage players
Detroit Fury players
Hamilton Tiger-Cats players
Sportspeople from Chattanooga, Tennessee
21st-century African-American sportspeople
20th-century African-American sportspeople